This is a list of the French SNEP Top 200 Singles and Top 200 Albums number-ones of 2022.

Number ones by week

Singles chart

Albums chart

See also
 2022 in music
 List of number-one hits (France)
 List of top 10 singles in 2022 (France)

References

France
2022
2022 in French music